Edward Arthur Dorking (June 18, 1893 – April 12, 1954) was a passenger on RMS Titanic and a survivor from the sinking. Originally from England, he toured the United States and Canada with a vaudeville show. He then fought in World War I and World War II, surviving both, and died in prison in 1954.

Biography
Edward Arthur Dorking was born on June 18, 1893, in Stamford Hill, Middlesex, England, the son of Edward Arthur Dorkings (b. 1867), a policeman, and Florence Derby (b. 1876).

Dorking boarded the Titanic at Southampton on April 10, 1912, as a Third Class passenger. He was emigrating to the United States to live with his uncle and aunt, Fred and Violet Cooke, in Oglesby, Illinois. He survived the sinking swimming for 35 minutes to lifeboat B and was later rescued by the Carpathia. He testified before the United States investigating committee and the British investigation.

According to his relatives, Dorking was openly gay and that was the reason why the family was sending him off to the United States.

After the sinking Dorking appeared on theaters with a tour of the Sullivan & Considine circuit, talking about the experience, like at Princeton, New Jersey, Fort Collins, Colorado, Salt Lake City, Utah, Ogden, Utah, San Francisco, California, Los Angeles, California, Portland, Oregon, Decatur, Illinois, Moline, Illinois, Tacoma, Washington, Davenport, Iowa, and Vancouver. He described his profession as "Vaudeville". According to him, none of the victims was to receive damages from the White Star company, and that was the reason why he was touring the theaters, to repay what he had lost.

Dorking enlisted into the U.S. Army in 1917 and was discharged in 1919.

After World War I he moved to Los Angeles, apparently after a run-in with the police in Chicago. In 1933 he was still living in Los Angeles and with his military pension entered a soldier's home in Sawtelle, Los Angeles.

He was drafted in 1942 to fight in World War II. Estranged from his family, Dorking spent his final days in prison on Terminal Island, San Pedro, California, and died April 12, 1954, three days before the anniversary of the sinking.

References

1893 births
1954 deaths
RMS Titanic survivors
United States Army personnel of World War I
United States Army personnel of World War II
American people who died in prison custody
Prisoners who died in California detention
English LGBT people
Gay men
British emigrants to the United States